Baculomia is a genus of stick insects in the tribe Clitumnini, erected by Bresseel & Constant in 2019.  Species have been recorded from Thailand and Vietnam.

Species
The Phasmida Species File lists:
 Baculomia baviensis Bresseel & Constant, 2019
 Baculomia pumatensis Bresseel & Constant, 2019 - type species (locality Vietnam)
 Baculomia siamensis (Brunner von Wattenwyl, 1907)

References

External links

Phasmatodea genera
Phasmatodea of Asia
Phasmatidae